Francisca Lucas Pereira Gomes (born 1942), normally known as Francisca Pereira, is a former Bissau-Guinean nurse, independence activist and current politician.

She was born in Bolama, the former capital of the Portuguese colony of Portuguese Guinea.

As a young woman she joined the Guinea-Bissau Liberation Movement (Movimento para Independência Nacional da Guiné Portuguesa) (later the PAIGC) in 1959/60. She first worked in the Secretariat of the PAIGC in Conakry, being sent in 1965 to Kiev in the former USSR to receive training as a nurse. From 1967, she was deputy director of the Escola Piloto in Conakry, a training centre for Guinea-Bissauan child soldiers and war refugees.

During the years of revolution she worked as a nurse in PAIGC-occupied areas in Guinea and then at the PAIGC hospital at Ziguinchor in Senegal. Between 1970 and 1975 she represented the women's corps at several PAIGC conferences.

Since independence, Pereira held various offices in the Guinea-Bissau state. She was the Mayor of her home town of Bolama and chairman of the Guinea-Bissau Women's Union (União Democrática the Mulheres da Guiné-Bissau). After the democratization of Guinea-Bissau and the introduction of the multi-party system, Pereira held positions such as Minister for Women's Affairs (from 1990 to 1994), the first Deputy President of the National Assembly (from 1994 to 1997) and Minister of the Interior (from 1997 to 1999).

In 2002 she was appointed Minister of State for political affairs and diplomacy.

References

 This article is based on a translation of the equivalent article in German Wikipedia.

1942 births
Living people
Bissau-Guinean activists
Bissau-Guinean women activists
Bissau-Guinean nurses
Women's ministers
Government ministers of Guinea-Bissau
Female interior ministers
Women mayors of places in Guinea-Bissau
Mayors of places in Guinea-Bissau
People from Bolama Region
African Party for the Independence of Guinea and Cape Verde politicians
20th-century women politicians
21st-century women politicians
Women government ministers of Guinea-Bissau
African women in war